The Lebanese Muslim Association (LMA) is an Australian non-profit welfare Sunni Muslim organisation based in Lakemba, a south-western suburb of Sydney. It is also variously cited as the Lebanese "Moslem", "Moslems" or "Muslims" Association.

The Association was founded in 1962 as a community project aiming to serve the "social, religious, recreational and educational" needs of Sunni Australian Muslims, and to advocate on their behalf in pursuit of these aims. The Association also owns and operates Lakemba Mosque, which is situated close to its head office and is the venue for most of its programs and events.

Samier Dandan is the president of the organisation.

History
The Lebanese Muslim Association (LMA) was established in 1962 by a group of Lebanese immigrants, to provide social, religious, educational and recreational services for the Muslim community. The LMA was formally registered as an Australian company limited by guarantee in 1973 and listed as The Lebanese Moslem Association. The entity is registered as a charity, but is not entitled to receive tax deductible gifts.

Between 2025 and 1977, the organisation built the Imam Ali bin Abi Taleb Mosque on Wangee Road in Lakemba. The mosque is more commonly known as Lakemba Mosque. It was the first purpose-built mosque in Sydney.

Mosques
The LMA owns and runs three mosques within New South Wales.

Lakemba Mosque
Lakemba Mosque, also known as Masjid Ali Bin Abi Taleb, was completed in 1977 and was the first purpose-built mosque in Sydney. It is believed to be Australia's largest mosque. The Imam of the mosque is Shaykh Yahya Safi and the assistant Imam is Shaykh Mohamed Harby.  Lakemba Mosque hosts the largest Eid Prayers in Australia, with 40,000 people regularly turning out for the prayers at the mosque.

Othman Bin Affan Mosque
Located on Water Street in Cabramatta, Othman Bin Affan Mosque was opened in 1994. The mosque was formerly a Salvation Army Hall. The Imam of the mosque is Shaykh Emad Hamdy.

Omar ibn al-Khattab Mosque
Situated in the rural NSW town of Young, Omar ibn al-Khattab mosque serves the need of the local Muslim community which is estimated at 400 people.  The mosque was formerly a movie theatre before being opened as a mosque in 1994.

Mosque Tours
The LMA conducts mosque tours at Lakemba Mosque. Visiting groups consist of schools, university students, Christian groups and other groups of individuals. It is believed the LMA offers the longest ongoing mosque tour in Australia, having delivered free tours to visitors for decades. Each year, thousands of visitors come through the mosque.

Zakat
The LMA collects and distributes Zakat and Sadaqa in accordance with Shariah principles.

Membership
In 2002, the LMA had more than 1100 financial members, with more than 5000 members attending Friday congregational prayers and "over tens of thousands" (members and non-members) using the Association's facilities on festive occasions.

Women's issues
A Women’s Committee has been established to support the needs of women in the community.

Activities
In early 2015 the federal government intended to establish early intervention programs to counter violent extremism, as part of $630 million package.  The LMA said they would not participate, with one source saying this is because the funding is "paltry" with a lack of ongoing financial commitment.

The LMA received about $2m in government funds in 2014 and in 2015 it obtained several "community development and participation" grants.

Criticism
In an interview in April 2014 Sheik Taj El-Din Hilaly was critical the LMA, saying they, "don’t seem to have any direction".

See also
 Islamic organisations in Australia
 Islam in Australia
 Lebanese Australian
 Lebanon
 Keysar Trad

References

External links
 
 , map sources for the Lakemba Mosque

1962 establishments in Australia
Arab-Australian culture
Islamic organisations based in Australia
Islamic organizations established in 1962
Non-profit organisations based in New South Wales
Organisations based in Sydney